The Lion and the Mouse is one of Aesop's Fables.

The Lion and the Mouse may also refer to:
 The Lion and the Mouse, a 1905 play by Charles Klein
 The Lion and the Mouse (1914 film), a lost 1914 silent film drama
 The Lion and the Mouse (1919 film), a lost silent film directed by Tom Terriss
 The Lion and the Mouse (1928 film), a film based on Klein's play
 The Lion & the Mouse, a 2009 children's book by Jerry Pinkney
 The Lion and Mouse, a sculpture by Marshall Fredericks